The 1934 Marshall Thundering Herd football team was an American football team that represented Marshall College (now Marshall University) as a member of the Buckeye Conference during the 1934 college football season. In its fourth season under head coach Tom Dandelet, the Thundering Herd compiled a 3–6 record (0–4 against conference opponents), and was outscored by a total of 111 to 93. John Zontini was the team captain.

Schedule

References

Marshall
Marshall Thundering Herd football seasons
Marshall Thundering Herd football